London Fog is an American manufacturer of coats and other apparel. The company was founded in 1923 as the Londontown clothing company by Israel Myers.

Products manufactured by London Fog include trench coats, raincoats, jackets, parkas. Accessories include handbags and umbrellas.

History 
During World War II the company was known for making waterproof clothing for the United States Navy. Following the war the company partnered with DuPont to make material for use in raincoats. These coats, which were the first to have a patented removable liner, were sold in Philadelphia, where they became very popular.

Myers started experimenting with different fabrics in 1951, working with blends of cotton and polyester to help make a waterproof fabric. London Fog introduced its first Maincoat and was found/sold in Saks Fifth Avenue in 1954, being one of the first companies to sell the raincoats and trench coats. The coat originally sold for $29.95, and named as a "Maincoat" by Myers so it could be worn all year around. The company went public in the 1960s. By the 1970s the company had its own stores and was manufacturing not only raincoats but also other types of clothes and accessories. At the time two-thirds of all raincoats sold in the United States were London Fog. London Fog expanded internationally during the 1990s selling in places like the United Kingdom and China.

 

By 1976, Interco bought London Fog, then in a Wall Street take over, they leveraged a buyout that then pushed the company into bankruptcy in 1991. Ultimately the company was renamed to London Fog Inc.,

The original location of the London Fog Factory was in the Meadow Mill area of Baltimore, Maryland. The factory was then moved to Eldersburg, Maryland, on Londontown Boulevard in 1976. In 1994, the company briefly left Eldersburg for Darien, Connecticut, but returned after less than a year. In 2000, most of London Fog's offices moved to Seattle, Washington, although the distribution center in Eldersburg remained in operation until 2002.

In 2006, London Fog was acquired by Iconix Brand Group, selling the outerwear division to Herman Kay Company.

In popular culture
London Fog appears as a client of the fictional advertising agency, Sterling Cooper, in the season 3 premiere of Mad Men. In August 2010, Mad Men castmember Christina Hendricks was contracted as the new celebrity model for London Fog.

Further reading

References

External links
 

Clothing companies of the United States
Manufacturing companies based in Baltimore
American companies established in 1923
Clothing companies established in 1923
1923 establishments in Maryland
American brands
Luggage brands
Iconix Brand Group
2006 mergers and acquisitions
1960s fashion
1970s fashion
1990s fashion